Olapa  is a genus of moths in the family Erebidae. The genus was erected by Francis Walker in 1855.

Species
Olapa atricosta (Hampson, 1909)
Olapa bipunctata (Holland, 1920) Congo
Olapa brachycerca Collenette, 1936 Angola
Olapa fulviceps Hampson, 1910 Congo
Olapa furva Hampson, 1905 southern Africa
Olapa ituri Collenette, 1931 Congo
Olapa jacksoni Collenette, 1957 Uganda
Olapa leptomita Collenette, 1931 Uganda
Olapa macrocerca Collenette, 1936 Angola
Olapa melanocera Hampson, 1909
Olapa nigribasis Janse, 1917 Zimbabwe
Olapa nigricosta Hampson, 1905 Tanzania, southern Africa
Olapa notia Collenette, 1959 Madagascar
Olapa nuda (Holland, 1897)
Olapa phaeospila Collenette, 1953 western Africa
Olapa sobo Collenette, 1960 Nigeria
Olapa tavetensis (Holland, 1892) eastern Africa
Olapa terina Collenette, 1959 Madagascar

References

Lymantriini
Moth genera